Nullity may refer to:

 Legal nullity, something without legal significance
 Nullity (conflict), a legal declaration that no marriage had ever come into being

Mathematics
 Nullity (linear algebra), the dimension of the kernel of a mathematical operator or null space of a matrix
 Nullity (graph theory), the nullity of the adjacency matrix of a graph
 Nullity, the difference between the size and rank of a subset in a matroid 
 Nullity, a concept in transreal arithmetic denoted by Φ